Joseph Ngwa Mfonyam (born February 7, 1948, in Bafut in the North West Province of Cameroon) works with the Bafut Language Association as an SIL International consultant.

Life
Mfonyam studied linguistics at the University of Yaoundé, getting his PhD in 1982. His work dealt with creating an alphabet for the Bafut language. Currently he lives in Bafut with his wife and two of his 5 children.

Work
Mfonyam published several books on the Bafut Language and was the head of the New Testament translation Project in Bafut, which was finished in the year 2000. Since then he has been working as Linguistics and Translation consultant for SIL Cameroon. He has been involved in training and checking Scripture translation of other language groups. He has written a number of books covering, anthropology, theological education and Christian Education. He has written and published a number of Linguistic articles.

References
SIL International Bibliography Mfonyam
PhD Dissertation Université de Yaoundé Mfonyam 1982

Niger–Congo languages
Cameroonian translators
1953 births
Living people